Karin Baal (born 19 September 1940), real name Karin Blauermel, is a German film actress. She has appeared in more than 90 films since 1956.

Filmography

Films

1956: Teenage Wolfpack
1957: Tired Theodore
1957: 
1957: The Heart of St. Pauli
1958: Rosemary
1958: Iron Gustav
1959: That's No Way to Land a Man
1959: 
1959: Jons und Erdme
1959: 
1959: The Juvenile Judge
1960: We Cellar Children
1960: Juke Box – Urli d'amore
1960: The Young Sinner
1960: 
1961: The Dead Eyes of London
1961: 
1961: You Must Be Blonde on Capri 
1961: 
1962: 
1962: 
1962: Between Shanghai and St. Pauli
1962: Street of Temptation
1964: Mission to Venice
1966: 
1968: The Hound of Blackwood Castle
1969: Hannibal Brooks
1972: What Have You Done to Solange?
1977: 
1981: Lili Marleen
1981: Angels of Iron
1981: Desperado City
1981: Lola
1982: 
1982: 
1984: 
1984: 
1986: Rosa Luxemburg
1988: The Passenger – Welcome to Germany
1991: The Terrible Threesome
1992: Cosimas Lexikon
2001: 
2004: Vinzent
2004: Das Kuckucksei
2005: Sieben Tage Sonntag

Television

1959: Das letzte Aufgebot
1962: Film an Bord
1963: Karibisches Vergnügen
1963: Der Privatsekretär
1964: Spätsommer
1964: Das Blaue vom Himmel
1965: Michael Kramer
1966: Der Mann aus Brooklyn
1966: Ein Mädchen von heute
1966: Herr Puntila und sein Knecht Matti
1966: Gespenster
1968: Tragödie auf der Jagd
1969: Ein Jahr ohne Sonntag (TV series)
1971: Der Kommissar: Die Anhalterin
1972: Das System Fabrizzi
1973: Ein für allemal
1974: The Unguarded House
1976: Erika's Passions
1976: Derrick - Season 3, Episode 5: "Schock"
1977: 
1979: Drei Freundinnen
1979: Desperado
1979: Wunder einer Nacht
1979: Die Weber
1979/80: Berlin Alexanderplatz
1980: Derrick - Season 7, Episode 8: "Auf einem Gutshof"
1980: Sternensommer (TV series)
1981: Derrick - Season 8, Episode 6 "Tod eines Italieners"
1984: 
1984: Le Dernier Civil
1984: Tod eines Schaustellers
1984: Die Abschiebung
1984: Derrick - Season 11, Episode 8: "Ein Mörder zu wenig"
1985: Der Galaxenbauer
1986: Die Fräulein von damals
1986: Dann ist nichts mehr wie vorher
1989: Der letzte Gast
1990: Marleneken
1993: Wenn Engel reisen (TV series)
1995: 
1996: 5 Stunden Angst – Geiselnahme im Kindergarten
1998: Alice auf der Flucht / Angst im Nacken
2001: Der Tunnel
2002: Betty – Schön wie der Tod
2003: Für immer verloren
2004: Fliege hat Angst
2005: Irren ist sexy
2006: 
2007: Hurenkinder
2009: Pfarrer Braun

References

External links

1940 births
Living people
German film actresses
German television actresses
Actresses from Berlin
20th-century German actresses
21st-century German actresses